Leptinaria is a genus of small tropical air-breathing land snails, terrestrial pulmonate gastropod mollusks in the family Achatinidae.

Species 
Species within the genus Leptinaria include:

 Leptinaria ambigua Martens, 1898
 Leptinaria biolleyi Martens, 1898
 Leptinaria convoluta Martens, 1898 
 Leptinaria costaricana Martens, 1898
 Leptinaria crenulata Martens, 1898

Leptinaria guatemalensis (Crosse & Fischer, 1877)
Leptinaria hapaloides Martens, 1898
Leptinaria insignis (Smith, 1898)
Leptinaria interstriata (Tate, 1870)
Leptinaria pittieri pittieri Martens, 1898
Leptinaria pittieri obliquata Martens, 1898
Leptinaria solida Martens, 1898
Leptinaria strebeliana Pilsbry, 1907
Leptinaria tamaulipensis Pilsbry, 1903
Leptinaria unilamellata (d’Orbigny, 1837) - synonym: Leptinaria lamellata (Potiez & Michaud, 1838)
Leptinaria sp. - endemic from Nicaragua

References 

Subulininae
Taxonomy articles created by Polbot